Seyitmahmut is a village in the Gerger District, Adıyaman Province, Turkey. The village is populated by Turks and had a population of 383 in 2021.

The hamlets of Dallı and Erenler are attached to the village.

References

Villages in Gerger District